Coco Island Airport is an airport located on Great Coco Island in Burma. The airport is no longer operational for civilian aircraft and has been converted into a military airfield.

References

Airports in Myanmar